The 1953 Colorado A&M Aggies football team represented Colorado State College of Agriculture and Mechanic Arts in the Skyline Conference during the 1953 college football season.  In their seventh season under head coach Bob Davis, the Aggies compiled a 4–5 record (3–4 against Skyline opponents), finished fifth in the Skyline Conference, and outscored all opponents by a total of 157 to 149.

No Colorado A&M players were selected by the Associated Press for its 1953 All-Skyline Conference football team.

Schedule

References

Colorado AandM
Colorado State Rams football seasons
Colorado AandM Aggies football